Bonei Olam ( - "builders of the world") is a Brooklyn, New York-based tax-exempt organization that assists Jewish couples that are experiencing infertility.

History
It was founded by and is currently led by Rabbi Shlomo Bochner and R' Yumi Kleinbart with a mission to provide funding for fertility treatments, and relieve couples of emotional and physical stress resulting from infertility. Bonei Olam's medical and rabbinical advisory board is headed by Rabbi Yechiel Mechel Steinmetz, the Skwere Dayan of Boro Park.

Bonei Olam started in Brooklyn and has grown to have branches across the United States as well as in Israel, Canada, Belgium and the United Kingdom. In 1999, the first baby funded by Bonei Olam was born. To date, Bonei Olam has been involved in the birth of over 10,000 children.

Bonei Olam is funded by private donations and government funding.

Services
Bonei Olam has developed a network of doctors and fertility centers across the world, enabling them to offer medical and financial assistance worldwide.

Bonei Olam assigns each couple a PIN in order to keep all of their cases confidential and private.  When a couple contacts Bonei Olam a team of trained counselors and medical experts provide consultations, referrals, counseling and an advanced genetics program to guide them through the labyrinth of medical information and assist them in their quest to become parents.

See also
A T.I.M.E.
Puah Institute
Religious response to ART

References

External links
Bonei Olam Website

Jewish medical organizations
Obstetrics and gynaecology organizations